Una Cita con la vida is a 1958 Argentine drama film directed by Hugo del Carril, starring Gilda Lousek and Enzo Viena. It is based on a novel by Bernardo Verbitsky.

Cast 
 Gilda Lousek as Nélida
 Enzo Viena as Luis
 Pedro Laxalt 
 Tito Alonso 
  as The Nélida's Mother
 Graciela Borges as The Nélida's friend
 Rodolfo Ranni as Luis's friend #1
 Javier Portales as Luis's friend #2

External links
 

1958 films
1950s Spanish-language films
Argentine black-and-white films
Films directed by Hugo del Carril
1950s Argentine films